One Heart is a 2003 album by Celine Dion.

One Heart may also refer to:
 "One Heart" (Celine Dion song), 2003
 "One Heart" (R.I.O. song), 2010
 One Heart (Sarah Geronimo album), 2011
 One Heart (film), a concert film about A. R. Rahman and his music